The women's 1500 metres event at the 1998 Commonwealth Games was held on 21 September on National Stadium, Bukit Jalil.

Results

References

1500
1998
1998 in women's athletics